Bugright (stylized as BUGRIGHT) is the 2nd full album by Japanese rock band, Uverworld. The album was released on February 21, 2007. A limited pressing of the album was released on the same day as the normal pressing. The limited pressing features a different cover and includes a special 3-piece casing, a DVD that contains the music videos of "Colors of the Heart", "Shamrock", "Kimi no Suki na Uta" and a documentary featuring the process of recording the album.

The album entered the Oricon charts 38 times and it is ranked 2nd at its peak. The album was certified gold by the Recording Industry Association of Japan.

The album's name is a blend of the English words, bug meaning wrong or defect and right meaning correct and justice.

Track listing

References

2007 albums
Uverworld albums
Gr8! Records albums
Japanese-language albums